Circuito Guadix is a motorsports facility located in Granada, Spain near the Sierra Nevada. The circuit was redesigned by Clive Greenhalgh and reopened in mid-January 2007.

The circuit is used by many companies including Renault Motorsport, KTM, Superbike Magazine and 95% of all British Superbike factory teams.

Events
A1 Grand Prix practice
FAA Campeonato Andalucia Automovilismo (Race meetings)
Neugrip (Bike Track Days)
Pedro Outon
Superbike Racing School
White Planet Cars (Car Track Days)
Trackdays Spain's Car Trackdays (every two months) 
Historic F1 testing.

References 
The all new Guadix Circuit
New car continues test programme of A1GP
The Trackdays Spain’s Guadix Race Circuit

External links 
Official Site

Motorsport venues in Andalusia
Sports venues in Andalusia